The vicuña (Lama vicugna) or vicuna (both , very rarely spelled vicugna, its former genus name) is one of the two wild South American camelids, which live in the high alpine areas of the Andes, the other being the guanaco, which lives at lower elevations. Vicuñas are relatives of the llama, and are now believed to be the wild ancestor of domesticated alpacas, which are raised for their coats. Vicuñas produce small amounts of extremely fine wool, which is very expensive because the animal can only be shorn every three years and has to be caught from the wild. When knitted together, the product of the vicuña's wool is very soft and warm. The Inca valued vicuñas highly for their wool, and it was against the law for anyone but royalty to wear vicuña garments; today, the vicuña is the national animal of Peru and appears on the Peruvian coat of arms.

Both under the rule of the Inca and today, vicuñas have been protected by law, but they were heavily hunted in the intervening period. At the time they were declared endangered in 1974, only about 6,000 animals were left. Today, the vicuña population has recovered to about 350,000, and although conservation organizations have reduced its level of threat classification, they still call for active conservation programs to protect populations from poaching, habitat loss, and other threats.

Previously the vicuña was thought not to have been domesticated, and the llama and the alpaca were both regarded as descendants of the closely related guanaco. But DNA research published in 2001 has shown the alpaca may well have vicuña parentage. Today, the vicuña is mainly wild, but the local people still perform special rituals with these creatures, including a fertility rite.

Description
The vicuña is considered more delicate and gracile than the guanaco, and smaller. A key distinguishing element of morphology is the better-developed incisor roots for the guanaco. The vicuña's long, woolly coat is tawny brown on the back, whereas the hair on the throat and chest is white and quite long. The head is slightly shorter than the guanaco's and the ears are slightly longer. The length of head and body ranges from 1.45 to 1.60 m (about 5 ft); shoulder height is from 75 to 85 cm (around 3 ft); its weight is from 35 to 65 kg (under 150 lb). It falls prey to the puma and culpeo.

Taxonomy and evolution
There are two subspecies of vicuña:
 
 Lama vicugna vicugna
 Lama vicugna mensalis

While vicuñas are restricted to the more extreme elevations of the Andes in modern times, they may have also been present in the lowland regions of Patagonia as much as 3500 km south of their current range during the Late Pleistocene and Early Holocene. Fossils of these lowland camelids have been assigned to a species known as Lama gracilis, but genetic and morphological analysis between them and modern vicuña indicate the two may be the same.

Distribution and habitat
Vicuñas are native to the central Andes in South America. They are found in Peru, northwestern Argentina, Bolivia, and northern Chile. A smaller, introduced population lives in central Ecuador. 

They feed in daytime on the grassy plains of the Andes Mountains, but spend the nights on the slopes. In these areas, only nutrient-poor, tough, bunch grasses and Festuca grow. The sun's rays are able to penetrate the thin atmosphere, producing relatively warm temperatures during the day; however, the temperatures drop to freezing at night. The vicuña's thick but soft coat is a special adaptation which traps layers of warm air close to its body, so it can tolerate freezing temperatures.

Chief predators include pumas and the  culpeo.

Behavior

The behavior of vicuñas is similar to that of the guanacos. They are very shy animals, and are easily aroused by intruders, due, among other things, to their extraordinary hearing. Like the guanacos, they frequently lick calcareous stones and rocks, which are rich in salt, and also drink salt water. Vicuñas are very clean animals, and always deposit their excrement in the same place.  Their diets consist mainly of low grasses which grow in clumps on the ground.

Vicuñas live in family-based groups made up of a male, 5 to 15 females, and their young.

Mating usually occurs in March–April, and after a gestation period of about 11 months, the female gives birth to a single fawn, which is nursed for about 10 months. The fawn becomes independent at about 12 to 18 months old. Young males form bachelor groups and the young females search for a sorority to join. This deters intraspecific competition and inbreeding.

Conservation

From the period of Spanish conquest to 1964, hunting of the vicuña was unrestricted, which reduced its numbers to only 6,000 in the 1960s. As a result, the species was declared endangered in 1974, and its status prohibited the trade of vicuña wool. In Peru, during 1964–1966, the Servicio Forestal y de Caza in cooperation with the US Peace Corps, Nature Conservancy, World Wildlife Fund, and the National Agrarian University of La Molina established a nature conservatory for the vicuña called the Pampa Galeras – Barbara D'Achille in Lucanas Province, Ayacucho. During that time, a game warden academy was held in Nazca, where eight men from Peru and six from Bolivia were trained to protect the vicuña from poaching.

To cooperate on the conservation of the vicuña, the governments of Bolivia and Peru signed the Convention for the Conservation of the Vicuña on 16 August 1969 in La Paz, explicitly leaving the treaty open to accession by Argentina and Chile. Ecuador acceded on 11 February 1976. The Convention prohibited international trade in the vicuña, domestic exploitation of the vicuña, and ordered the parties to create reserves and breeding centres. A follow-up treaty, the Convention for the Conservation and Management of the Vicuña, was signed between Bolivia, Chile, Ecuador and Peru on 20 December 1979 in Lima. It explicitly allowed only Argentina to sign it if it also signed the 1969 La Paz Convention (Article 12; Argentina joined in 1981), and did not allow other countries to accede to the convention 'due to its specific character' (Article 13). The 1979 Convention did allow the use of the vicuña under strict circumstances if the animal population had recovered sufficiently. In combination with CITES (effective in 1975), as well as USA and EU trade legislation, the Conventions were extremely successful, as the vicuña population substantially grew as a result.

The estimated population in Peru increased from 6,000 to 75,000 with protection by game wardens. Currently, the community of Lucanas conducts a chaccu (herding, capturing, and shearing) on the reserve each year to harvest the wool, organized by the National Council for South American Camelids (CONACS).

In Bolivia, the Ulla Ulla National Reserve was founded in 1977 partly as a sanctuary for the species. Their numbers grew to 125,000 in Peru, Chile, Argentina, and Bolivia. Since this was a ready "cash crop" for community members, the countries relaxed regulations on vicuña wool in 1993, enabling its trade once again. The wool is sold on the world market for over $300 per kg, to help support the community. In 2002, the US Fish and Wildlife Service reclassified most populations as threatened, but still lists Ecuador's population as endangered. While the population levels have recovered to a healthy level, poaching remains a constant threat, as do habitat loss and other threats. Consequently, the IUCN still supports active conservation programs to protect vicuñas, though they lowered their status to least concern in 2018.

Vicuña wool

The wool is popular due to its warmth, and is used for apparel such as socks, sweaters, accessories, shawls, coats, and suits, and home furnishings such as blankets and throws. Its properties come from the tiny scales on the hollow, air-filled fibres. It causes them to interlock and trap insulating air. Vicuñas have some of the finest fibers in the world, at a diameter of 12 μm. The fiber of cashmere goats is 14 to 19 μm, while angora rabbit is 8 to 12 μm and that of shahtoosh from the Tibetan antelope, or chiru, is from 9 to 12 μm.

Gallery

References

Notes

External links

 
 
 
 Convention for the Conservation of the Vicuña (La Paz 1969, including the 1976 Ecuadorian accession) – Spanish Wikisource
 Convention for the Conservation and Management of the Vicuña (Lima 1979) – Spanish Wikisource
 Convention for the Conservation and Management of the Vicuña (Lima 1979) – Original scan at Conveniovicuna.org

Camelids
Mammals of the Andes
Mammals of Argentina
Mammals of Bolivia
Mammals of Chile
Mammals of Peru
Wool animals
Andean studies
Mammals described in 1782
Taxa named by Juan Ignacio Molina
Taxobox binomials not recognized by IUCN 
National symbols of Peru